Bickford is a surname. Notable people with the surname include:

Andrew Bickford (1844-1927), Admiral, Royal Navy; Commander-in-Chief, Pacific Station
Bruce Bickford (animator) (born 1947), American animated-films maker
Bruce Bickford (athlete) (born 1957), American long-distance runner
Charles Bickford (1891–1967), American actor
George Bickford (1927–2009), Australian rules footballer
James Bickford (bobsleigh) (1912–1989), American olympic bobsledder
John F. Bickford (1843–1927), received the Medal of Honor for actions during the American Civil War
Matthew Bickford (1839–1918), received the Medal of Honor for actions during the American Civil War
Phil Bickford (born 1995), American baseball player
Vern Bickford (1920–1960), American baseball pitcher
William Bickford (1774–1834), inventor of the safety fuse
William Bickford (1815–1850), first pharmacist and pharmaceutical chemist in the colony of South Australia
William Bickford (1841–1916), turned A.M. Bickford & Sons into a major drug company and successful soft-drink manufacturer